MainStreet was a department store chain based in Chicago, Illinois, United States. The chain was launched in November 1983 by Federated Department Stores (now known as Macy's, Inc.). Throughout the 1980s, the chain expanded to twenty-nine stores in Illinois, Michigan, Indiana, and Minnesota. By 1988, MainStreet was sold to the Wisconsin-based chain Kohl's, which converted most MainStreet locations to Kohl's that year.

History
Federated Department Stores, now known as Macy's, Inc., founded the MainStreet chain in 1983 with seven stores in the Chicago, Illinois area. The store was a middle-market chain focused primarily on softlines, similar to Kohl's and Mervyns. MainStreet stores often featured a "racetrack" layout like a discounter, but checkouts were distributed around the store like a traditional department store. The first locations outside the Chicago area opened around Metro Detroit in 1986.

The MainStreet chain was sold by Campeau Corporation, then-owners of Federated, in order to reduce debts following Campeau's buyout of Federated. Kohl's acquired twenty-six of the twenty-nine MainStreet locations in 1988 for $90 million, and converted them to the Kohl's nameplate in March 1989.

References

Defunct department stores based in Chicago
Defunct companies based in Chicago
American companies established in 1983
Retail companies established in 1983
Retail companies disestablished in 1988
1983 establishments in Illinois
1988 disestablishments in Illinois
Macy's